Libystica is a genus of moths of the family Noctuidae. The genus was erected by George Hampson in 1926.

Species
Libystica costalis Walker, 1865
Libystica crenata Hampson, 1926
Libystica eucampima Hampson, 1926
Libystica lunaris Gaede, 1940
Libystica simplex Holland, 1894
Libystica succedens Gaede, 1940
Libystica woerdenialis Snellen, 1872

References

Catocalinae